Bronisław Kaper (February 5, 1902 – April 26, 1983) was a Polish film composer who scored films and musical theater in Germany, France, and the USA. The American immigration authorities misspelled his name as Bronislau Kaper. He was also variously credited as Bronislaw Kaper, Bronislaw Kapper, Benjamin Kapper, and Edward Kane.

Kaper is perhaps best remembered as the composer of the jazz standards "On Green Dolphin Street" (lyrics by Ned Washington) and "Invitation" (lyrics by Paul Francis Webster) which were the respective title songs for the Metro-Goldwyn-Mayer films Green Dolphin Street (1947) and Invitation (1952). He also scored the MGM film musical Lili (1953) for which he received the Academy Award for Best Original Score. Kaper's later works include Mutiny on the Bounty (1962) and the TV series The F.B.I. (1965–1974).

Biography
Bronisław Kaper was born in Warsaw, Poland, to an Ashkenazi Jewish family, and began playing the piano at the age of six, and soon demonstrated considerable talent on this instrument. He studied composition and piano at the Warsaw Conservatory, and law at Warsaw University, in deference to his father's wishes. Soon after completing his studies, Kaper went to Berlin—then a city teeming with theaters and cabarets, where many artists from other parts of Europe lived.

In Berlin, in the late 1920s, Kaper met another young composer, the Austrian Walter Jurmann. The two worked as a team, first in Berlin and then, after the Nazis took power in Germany, in Paris, France. The emergence of sound film created a major market for their talents. In Paris, they composed music for films directed by persons who had fled the rise of Nazism and consequent persecution of Jews and other minorities.

In 1935, upon being offered a seven-year contract with MGM by studio head Louis B. Mayer, Kaper and Jurmann emigrated to the United States, where they continued their work. One of their first American films was the Marx Brothers comedy A Night at the Opera (1935), for which they composed the song "Cosi-Cosa". Kaper and Jurmann also co-wrote the theme song for the 1936 film San Francisco. They worked again with the Marx Brothers on their follow-up film, A Day at the Races (1937), for which Kaper, Jurmann, and Gus Kahn wrote the song "All God's Chillun Got Rhythm", which became a minor jazz standard.
 
Kaper was part of a significant community of refugees in Los Angeles during the 1940s who had fled Nazi-occupied/war-torn Europe for the United States. This community included composers, writers, and filmmakers such as Thomas and Heinrich Mann, Bertolt Brecht, Arnold Schoenberg, Lion Feuchtwanger, Max Reinhardt, Hanns Eisler, and Berthold and Salka Viertel.

His sole musical theater venture in New York was 1946's Polonaise, for which he both adapted music by Chopin, and composed many numbers himself.

In 1947, Kaper scored the Metro-Goldwyn-Mayer film Green Dolphin Street, whose title song "On Green Dolphin Street" (lyrics by Ned Washington) is perhaps Kaper's most enduring and popular composition. It has since become a jazz standard, recorded by artists including Miles Davis, Sarah Vaughan, John Coltrane, Tony Bennett, and Eric Dolphy. Kaper composed perhaps his second most-enduring song "Invitation (song)" (lyrics by Paul Francis Webster) for director George Cukor's melodrama A Life of Her Own; but it was not until its use as the theme song for the 1952 film Invitation that the song became popular. "Invitation" has been widely recorded, by artists including Quincy Jones, Rosemary Clooney, Dinah Washington, and Jaco Pastorius as the title track of his 1983 album Invitation (Jaco Pastorius album). In 1954, Kaper won an Oscar for scoring of the musical Lili (1953) starring Leslie Caron, and featuring Kaper's song "Hi-Lili, Hi-Lo" with lyrics by Helen Deutsch. Kaper also scored Caron's next film, The Glass Slipper, a musical adaptation of the fairy tale Cinderella.

In 1959, Kaper composed most of the music for MGM's production of Green Mansions with Audrey Hepburn and Anthony Perkins, after MGM had asked Brazilian composer Heitor Villa-Lobos to write the score. Only some of Villa-Lobos' music was used in the film; much of the rest was later arranged as the secular cantata Forest of the Amazons, which Villa-Lobos recorded in stereophonic sound for United Artists Records with the Symphony of the Air. One of Kaper's last projects under his MGM contract was also his most ambitious: the big-budget 1962 remake of Mutiny on the Bounty starring Marlon Brando, for which he wrote epic seafaring melodies as well as native Polynesian music (Nominated for Academy Award for Best Musical Score). MGM had originally wanted composer Miklós Rózsa (who was known for lush epics) to score this remake, but Rózsa declined. The film's love theme "Love Song from Mutiny on the Bounty (Follow Me)" has found a place in the repertoire of popular Polynesian music and is occasionally performed for tourists at Luaus. Kaper's interest in melding exotic indigenous music with traditional styles continued in Lord Jim, where he introduced Western audiences to the unique sound of the southeast-Asian gamelan orchestra. For television, Kaper composed the theme music and several scores for the Quinn Martin-produced series The F.B.I. In total, Kaper composed music for nearly 150 Hollywood films.

Credits on Broadway
Polonaise (1945) – musical – composer
Mostly Sondheim (2002) – concert – featured songwriter

Recordings - film scores
Recordings of many of Kaper's film scores were not available in his lifetime but, in recent decades, many of these previously unavailable recordings have been re-released and/or re-recorded on compact disc for labels like Monstrous Movie Music (Them!), and Film Score Monthly (Lili, Home from the Hill, The Swan and others).

Legacy

The Bronisław Kaper Awards
The Bronisław Kaper Awards For Young Artists are held annually by the Los Angeles Philharmonic for the piano and strings instrumental categories, which alternate each year. Named in honor of Bronisław Kaper, who served for more than 15 years as a member of the Los Angeles Philharmonic Association's Board of Directors, the Awards encourage the development of young and gifted musicians. Award winners receive monetary awards: first place receiving $2,500, second place receiving $2,000 and Most Promising Musician winning $500.

The 2007 Bronisław Kaper Awards competition has been for string players.

Selected filmography

 The Big Attraction (1931)
 A Mad Idea (1932)
 His Highness Love (1931)
 Marriage with Limited Liability (1931)
 Scandal on Park Street (1932)
 Three on a Honeymoon (1932)
 Honeymoon Trip (1933)
 Things Are Getting Better Already (1932)
 Madame Wants No Children (1933)
 A Song for You (1933)
 Today Is the Day (1933)
 All for Love (1933)
 A Man Has Been Stolen (1934)
 Moscow Nights (1934)
 A Day at the Races (1937)
 The Captain Is a Lady (1940)
 Above Suspicion (1943)
 Gaslight (1944)
 Mrs. Parkington (1944)
 The Stranger (1946)
 The Great Sinner (1949)
 A Life of Her Own (1950)
 To Please a Lady (1950)
 The Red Badge of Courage (1951)
 The Naked Spur (1953)
 Lili (1953)
 Them! (1954)
 The Prodigal (1955)
 The Glass Slipper (1955)
 The Adventures of Quentin Durward (1955)
 The Swan (1956)
 Somebody Up There Likes Me (1956)
 The Barretts of Wimpole Street (1957)
 Jet Pilot (1957)
 Don't Go Near the Water (1957)
 The Brothers Karamazov (1958)
 Auntie Mame (1958)
 Green Mansions (1959)
 The Scapegoat (1959)
 Home from the Hill (1960)
 BUtterfield 8 (1960)
 Ada (1961)
 Mutiny on the Bounty (1962)
 Kisses for My President (1964)
 Lord Jim (1965)
 Tobruk (1967)
 The Way West (1967)
 Counterpoint (1968)
 A Flea in Her Ear (1968)

See also

Cinema of Poland
List of Polish Academy Award winners and nominees
List of Poles

Sources
 Viertel, Salka, The Kindness of Strangers (New York: Rinehart,1969), pp. 250–251
 Elisabeth Buxbaum: Veronika, der Lenz ist da. Walter Jurmann – Ein Musiker zwischen den Welten und Zeiten. Mit einem Werkverzeichnis von Alexander Sieghardt. Edition Steinbauer, Wien 2006,

References

External links
 
 
  Kaper filmography/discography at Soundtrack Collector
 

1902 births
1983 deaths
American film score composers
Best Original Music Score Academy Award winners
Burials at Hollywood Forever Cemetery
Musicians from Warsaw
Polish film score composers
American male film score composers
20th-century classical composers
20th-century American composers
20th-century American male musicians
Jewish American film score composers
20th-century American Jews
Polish emigrants to the United States
Polish expatriates in Germany
Polish expatriates in France